Filothei–Psychiko is a municipality in the North Athens regional unit, Attica, Greece. The seat of the municipality is the town Psychiko.

Municipality
The municipality Filothei–Psychiko was formed at the 2011 local government reform by the merger of the following 3 former municipalities, that became municipal units:
Filothei
Neo Psychiko
Psychiko

The municipality has an area of 6.077 km2.

References

Populated places in North Athens (regional unit)
Municipalities of Attica